Louise Crome (born 6 April 1978, in Waihi, New Zealand) is a former professional squash player from New Zealand. She toured for 3 years reaching a world ranking of 22.  She was a member of the New Zealand Women's Team between 2004 - 2008 and won titles in Finland, Vietnam and Welsh Opens, and second place in Mexico, Los Angeles, Toronto Opens and New Zealand Championships.

In 2004, Crome won silver in the women's doubles event at the World Doubles Squash Championships, partnering Lara Petera. In 2006, Petera and Crome won bronze at the World Doubles Championships and later that year she represented New Zealand at the 2006 Commonwealth Games at Melbourne.

Crome graduated from the University of Auckland with a Bachelor of Commerce in Information Systems and a Masters of Business Administration with distinction from Victoria University.

She is married to the former politician and former ACT New Zealand party leader Rodney Hide.

References

External links 
 
 
 

New Zealand female squash players
1978 births
Living people
University of Auckland alumni
People from Waihi
Commonwealth Games competitors for New Zealand
Squash players at the 2006 Commonwealth Games
Sportspeople from Waikato